Keith Phillips (1915-1974) was an Australian professional rugby league footballer who played in the 1940s.

Playing career

Phillips made his first grade debut for Newtown in 1940. In 1943, Phillips was a member of the Newtown side which won their third and last premiership, defeating North Sydney 34–7 in the grand final, with Phillips scoring a try.

The following season, Phillips was a member of the Newtown side which finished as minor premiers and reached the 1944 grand final against Balmain. Newtown lost the first grand final 19–16, but as minor premiers they had the right to challenge for a rematch. Newtown lost the second grand final replay, 12–8. Phillips played two further seasons before retiring at the end of the 1946 season.

Phillips married Phyllis Lind, the sister of Newtown player Fred Lind in Marrickville on 6 November 1943.

References

External links

1915 births
1974 deaths
Australian rugby league players
Newtown Jets players
New South Wales rugby league team players
Rugby league players from New South Wales
Rugby league second-rows